Adoxophyes luctuosa is a species of moth of the family Tortricidae first described by Józef Razowski in 2013. It is found on Seram Island in Indonesia. The habitat consists of lower montane forests.

The wingspan is about 20 mm. The forewings are nearly unicolorous brown with rust admixture and sparse brown strigulation (fine streaks). The hindwings are white cream, strigulated and suffused with grey brown in the apical area.

Etymology
The species name refers to the colouration of the species and is derived from Latin luctuosa (meaning sad).

References

Moths described in 2013
Adoxophyes
Moths of Indonesia